Muhammad Umar Bhutta (born 24 December 1992 in Bahawalpur, Punjab, Pakistan) is a Pakistani field hockey player.

Career

2012
Bhutta was included in the squad for the 2012 Olympic Games in London, UK.

References

External links

1992 births
Living people
Pakistani male field hockey players
Field hockey players at the 2012 Summer Olympics
Olympic field hockey players of Pakistan
2010 Men's Hockey World Cup players
Field hockey players at the 2014 Asian Games
Field hockey players at the 2018 Asian Games
2018 Men's Hockey World Cup players
Asian Games silver medalists for Pakistan
Asian Games medalists in field hockey
Medalists at the 2014 Asian Games
21st-century Pakistani people